The 2017 European Amputee Football Championship was the first edition of the annual international competition of amputee football national men's teams. It was organized by the European Amputee Football Federation (EAFF), and was held in Istanbul, Turkey between October 1–10, 2017. The championship's drawing ceremony took place in Riva, Beykoz, Istanbul on August 19 to determine the groups.

Turkey won the title for the first time, defeating England in the final. Poland became bronze medalist before Spain. All matches were played at the Turkish Football Federation Hasan Doğan National Teams Camp and Training Facility in Riva, Beykoz but the final at Vodafone Park in Beşiktaş.

Participating nations
Following 12 nations competed in three groups. The first two ranking teams (green) in each group plus the two best third-ranking teams (lime green) qualified for the knockout stage of quarterfinals.

Preliminary round

Group A

Group B

Group C

9th–12th place round

Knockout stage

Quarterfinals

Russian team withdrawal
During the quarterfinal match of Turkey vs. Russia on October 7, 2017, Russian player Shakbulatov was shown a red card after receiving his second yellow card and was sent off. As he was leaving the pitch, he pushed a referee standing by the sideline down to the ground. Right after the incident, the match's referee decided to end the match in the 69th minute in the overtime while Turkey was in lead by 2–1. The Russian team withdrew from the championship and did not show up in the further match against Ireland.

5th–8th place knockout

Semifinals

Bronze medal match

Gold medal match

Rankings

References

International association football competitions hosted by Turkey
2017 in disability sport
Amputee
Sports competitions in Istanbul
Sport in Beykoz
Sport in Beşiktaş
2017 in association football
2017
October 2017 sports events in Turkey
2017